The Cochran frog (Nymphargus cochranae) is a frog in the family Centrolenidae found in the lower Amazonian slopes of the Cordillera Occidental of Ecuador and adjacent Colombia.

Cochran frog may also refer to various frogs in the family Centrolenidae:

 Alban Cochran frog (Centrolene daidaleum), a frog found in Colombia and Venezuela
 Caqueta Cochran frog (Nymphargus oreonympha), a frog endemic to Colombia
 Grainy Cochran frog (Cochranella granulosa), a frog found in Costa Rica, Honduras, Nicaragua, and Panama
 Lonely Cochran frog (Centrolene solitaria), a frog endemic to Colombia
 Peru Cochran frog (Nymphargus chancas), a frog endemic to Peru
 Ruiz's Cochran frog (Nymphargus ruizi), a frog endemic to Colombia
 Santa Cecilia Cochran frog (Teratohyla midas), a frog found in Brazil, Ecuador, Peru, and Colombia
 Spiny Cochran frog (Teratohyla spinosa), a frog found in Colombia, Costa Rica, Ecuador, Honduras, Panama, and Nicaragua
 Spotted Cochran frog (Nymphargus ocellatus), a frog endemic to the Amazonian slopes of Andes in Peru

Animal common name disambiguation pages